Polyester resins are synthetic resins formed by the reaction of dibasic organic acids and polyhydric alcohols. Maleic anhydride is a commonly used raw material with diacid functionality in unsaturated polyester resins. Unsaturated polyester resins are used in sheet moulding compound, bulk moulding compound and the toner of laser printers. Wall panels fabricated from polyester resins reinforced with fiberglassso-called fiberglass reinforced plastic (FRP)are typically used in restaurants, kitchens, restrooms and other areas that require washable low-maintenance walls. They are also used extensively in cured-in-place pipe applications. Departments of Transportation in the USA also specify them for use as overlays on roads and bridges. In this application they are known AS Polyester Concrete Overlays (PCO). These are usually based on isophthalic acid and cut with styrene at high levelsusually up to 50%. Polyesters are also used in anchor bolt adhesives though epoxy based materials are also used. Many companies have and continue to introduce styrene free systems mainly due to odor issues, but also over concerns that styrene is a potential carcinogen. Drinking water applications also prefer styrene free. Most polyester resins are viscous, pale coloured liquids consisting of a solution of a polyester in a reactive diluent which is usually styrene, but can also include vinyl toluene and various acrylates.

Unsaturated polyester 
Unsaturated polyesters are condensation polymers formed by the reaction of polyols (also known as polyhydric alcohols), organic compounds with multiple alcohol or hydroxy functional groups, with unsaturated and in some cases saturated dibasic acids. Typical polyols used are glycols including ethylene glycol, propylene glycol, and diethylene glycol; typical acids used are phthalic acid, isophthalic acid, terephthalic acid, and maleic anhydride. Water, a condensation by-product of esterification reactions, is continuously removed by distillation, driving the reaction to completion via Le Chatlier's principle. Unsaturated polyesters are generally sold to parts manufacturers as a solution of resin in reactive diluent; styrene is the most common diluent and the industry standard. The diluent allows control over the viscosity of the resin, and is also a participant in the curing reaction. The initially liquid resin is converted to a solid by cross-linking chains. This is done by creating free radicals at unsaturated bonds, which propagate in a chain reaction to other unsaturated bonds in adjacent molecules, linking them in the process. Unsaturation is generally in the form of maleate and fumarate species along the polymer chain. Maleate/fumarate generally does not self-polymerize via radical reactions, but readily reacts with styrene. Maleic anhydride and styrene are known to form alternating copolymers, and are in fact the textbook case of this phenomenon. This is one reason that styrene has been so hard to displace in the market as the industry standard reactive diluent for unsaturated polyester resins, despite increasing efforts to displace the material such as California's Proposition 65. The initial free radicals are induced by adding a compound that easily decomposes into free radicals. This compound is known as the catalyst within the industry, but initiator is a more appropriate term. Transition metal salts are usually added as a catalyst for the chain-growth crosslinking reaction, and in the industry this type of additive is known as a promoter; the promoter is generally understood to lower the bond dissociation energy of the radical initiator. Cobalt salts are the most common type of promoter used. Common radical initiators used are organic peroxides such as benzoyl peroxide or methyl ethyl ketone peroxide.

Polyester resins are thermosetting and, as with other resins, cure exothermically. The use of excessive initiator especially with a catalyst present can, therefore, cause charring or even ignition during the curing process. Excessive catalyst may also cause the product to fracture or form a rubbery material.

Unsaturated polyesters (UPR) are utilized in many different industrially relevant markets, but in general are used as the matrix material for various types of composites. Glass fiber-reinforced composites comprise the largest segment into which UPRs are used and can be processed via SMC, BMC, pultrusion, cured-in-place pipe (known as relining in Europe), filament winding, vacuum molding, spray-up molding, resin transfer molding (RTM). Wind turbine blades also use them as well as many more processes. UPRs are also used in non-reinforced applications with common examples being gel coats, shirt buttons, mine-bolts,  bowling ball cores, polymer concrete, and  engineered stone/cultured marble.

Chemistry

In organic chemistry, an ester is formed as the condensation product of a carboxylic acid and an alcohol, with water formed as the condensate by-product. An ester can also be produced with an acyl halide and an alcohol, in which case the condensate by-product is a hydrogen halide.

Polyesters are a category of polymers in which ester functionality repeats within the main chain. Polyesters are a classic example of step-growth polymer, in which a difunctional (or higher order) acid or acyl halide is reacted with a difunctional (or higher order) alcohol. Polyesters are produced commercially both as saturated and unsaturated resins. The most common and highest volume produced polyester is  Polyethylene terephthalate (PET), which is an example of a saturated polyester and finds utilization in such applications as fibers for clothing and carpet, food and liquid containers (such as a water/soda bottles), as well as films.

In unsaturated polyester (UPR) chemistry, unsaturation sites are present along the chain, usually by incorporation of maleic anhydride, but maleic acid and fumaric acid are also used. Maleic acid and fumaric acid are isomers where maleic is the cis-isomer and fumaric is the trans-isomer. The ester forms of these two molecules are maleate and fumarate, respectively. When curing a UPR, the fumarate form is known to react more rapidly with the styrene radical, so isomerization catalysts, such as N,N-dimethylacetoacetamide (DMAA), are often employed in the synthesis process which converts the maleates into fumarates; the isomerization can also be encouraged with increased reaction time and temperature.
Within the UPR industry, the classification of the resins is generally based on the primary saturated acid. For example, a resin containing primarily terephthalic acid is known as a Tere resin, a resin containing primarily phthalic anhydride is known as an Ortho resin, and a resin containing primarily isophthalic acid is known as an Iso resin.  Dicyclopentadiene (DCPD) is also a common UPR raw material, and can be incorporated two different ways. In one process, the DCPD is cracked in situ to form cyclopentadiene which can then be reacted with maleate/fumarate groups along the polymer chain via a Diels-alder reaction. This type of resin is known as a Nadic resin and is referred to as a poor man's Ortho, due to sharing many similar properties of an Ortho resin along with the extremely low cost of DCPD raw material. In another process, maleic anhydride is first opened with water or another alcohol to form maleic acid and is then reacted with DCPD where an alcohol from the maleic acid reacts across one of the double bonds of the DCPD. This product is then used to end-cap the UPR resin which yields a product with unsaturation on the end-groups. This type of resin is referred to as a DCPD resin.

Ortho resins comprise the most common type of UPR, and many are known as general purpose resins. FRP composites utilizing ortho resins are found in such application as boat hulls, bath ware, and bowling ball cores.

Iso resins are generally on the higher end of UPR products, both because of the relatively higher cost of the isophthalic acid as well as the superior properties they possess. Iso resins are the primary type of resin used in gel coat applications, which is similar to a paint, but is sprayed into a mold before the FRP is molded leaving a coating on the part. Gel coat resins must have lower color (almost clear) so as to not impart additional color to the part or so that they can be dyed properly. Gel coats must also have strong resistance to UV-weathering and water blistering.

Tere resins are often used when high modulus and strength are desired, but the low color properties of an Iso resin is not necessary.  Terephthalic acid is generally lower cost than isophthalic acid, but both give similar strength characteristics to a UPR product. There exists a special sub-set of Tere resins, known as PET UPR resins, which are produced by catalytically cracking PET resin in the reactor to yield a mixture of terephthalic acid and ethylene glycol. Additional acids and glycols are then added along with maleic anhydride and a new polymer is produced. The end product is functionally the same as a Tere resin, but can often be lower cost to manufacture as scrap PET can be sourced cheaply. If a glycol-modified PET (PET-G) is used, exceptional properties can be imparted to the resin due to some of the exotic materials used in PET-G production. Tere and PET-UPR resins are used in many applications including cured-in-place pipe.

Biodegradation

Lichens have been shown to deteriorate polyester resins, as can be seen in archaeological sites in the Roman city of Baelo Claudia Spain.

Advantages
Polyester resin offers the following advantages: 
 Adequate resistance to water and variety of chemicals.
 Adequate resistance to weathering and ageing.
 Low cost. 
 Polyesters can withstand a temperature up to 80 °C.
 Polyesters have good wetting to glass fibres.
 Relatively low shrinkage at between 4–8% during curing.
 Linear thermal expansion ranges from 100–200 x 10−6 K−1.

Disadvantages
Polyester resin has the following disadvantages: 
 Strong styrene odour
 More difficult to mix than other resins, such as a two-part epoxy
 The toxic nature of its fumes, and especially of its catalyst, MEKP, pose a safety risk if proper protection isn't used
 Not appropriate for bonding many substrates
 The finished cure is most likely weaker than an equal amount of an epoxy resin

See also
 Polyester
 Styrene
 Thermoset polymer matrix
 Thermosetting polymer
 Vinyl ester

References

Polyesters
Synthetic resins
Thermosetting plastics
Polymer chemistry